The Golden Demon competition is the miniature painting and modelling competition run by Games Workshop, and is held during the Games Day Event in the UK, United States and other countries.

History
The Golden Demon competition is a miniatures painting competition that has been held annually since 1987. It started in the UK with the first Golden Demon at the Victoria Leisure centre in Nottingham. The original competition featured seven categories, and formed the basis for the categories that would become typical of later competitions, such as “Single Miniature” and “Monster”.

The event would go on to become a feature of Games Workshop’s Games Day events, and Golden Demon competitions would be held over 10 countries throughout its lifetime. These include The UK, USA, Canada, France, Australia, Germany, Spain, Italy, Poland and Japan. In more recent years, it has appeared only at Games Workshop’s events in the UK and Europe. A return to the US in 2020 after an absence of seven years was planned but then cancelled due to the COVID-19 pandemic. A USA Golden Demon competition is now planned for 2021. 

The competition is named for the first prize trophy in each category, the Golden Demon. The Golden Demon trophy itself is a small statue of a horned demon painted gold, posed with its arms crossed over its chest (in a manner somewhat reminiscent of the Oscar). Silver and Bronze Demon trophies are given for second and third places, respectively in each category.

At the end of the award ceremony, the Slayer Sword is awarded for the best painted miniature in the competition. This is a 5” tall broadsword that the winner is asked to pick up with a chainmail glove. An honours board of Slayer Sword winners is maintained at Games Workshop’s Warhammer World exhibition centre in Nottingham.

The competition’s judges are selected from Games Workshop’s studio staff and ‘Eavy Metal painting team members. They judge the entries on “technical skill, atmosphere, consistency in quality, and narrative”.

Example categories
Taken from the Golden Demon 2020 US categories list
Warhammer 40,000 Single Miniature
Warhammer 40,000 Squad
Warhammer 40,000 Vehicle
Warhammer 40,000 Large Model
Warhammer Age of Sigmar Single Miniature
Warhammer Age of Sigmar Unit
Warhammer Age of Sigmar Large Model
Middle Earth Single Miniature
"Duel"
Diorama
"Small Scale"
Young Bloods (ages 14 and under)
Open Competition (Any entry, this is the only category open to Games Workshop staff)

Competition rules

Key points of rules paraphrased from Golden Demon website:

"You can only enter once in each category"
"all entries...must be painted Citadel miniatures, Forge World or Imperial Armour models or scratch-built models that you have sculpted yourself. 
Entries from other miniature companies are not accepted.
Entry to any of the competitions gives Games Workshop the right to photograph and publish details of models entered as they see fit.

Territorial differences

Previously in Australia the Golden Demon competition has been slightly different: entrants take their models to a Games Workshop store on a specified day.  The best 3 in each category in the store gain a place in the regional finals and the best 3 in each category there gain a place in the national finals in Sydney.

Starting in 2007, Australian Golden Demon has included an "Intermediate" category. This category is open to painters aged 15–17, and has both the Warhammer Fantasy and 40000 miniatures combined.

As of 2020, there are currently Golden Demon Competitions running in the USA at Adepticon and at Games Workshop's own Warhammer Fest event.>

References

External links 
 Site listing winners since 1987
 Games Workshop Golden Demon page
 Golden Demon winners for 2005

Competitions
Games Workshop